The United States House of Representatives elections in California, 1912 was an election for California's delegation to the United States House of Representatives, which occurred as part of the general election of the House of Representatives on November 5, 1912. California gained three seats as a result of the 1910 Census, all of which were won by Republicans. Of California's existing districts, Republicans lost three, two to Democrats and one to a Republican-turned-Progressive.

Overview

Delegation composition

Results

District 1

District 2

District 3

District 4

District 5

District 6

District 7

District 8

District 9

District 10

District 11

See also
63rd United States Congress
Political party strength in California
Political party strength in U.S. states
United States House of Representatives elections, 1912

References
California Elections Page
Office of the Clerk of the House of Representatives

External links
California Legislative District Maps (1911-Present)
RAND California Election Returns: District Definitions

1912
California United States House of Representatives
1912 California elections